Monirs Sultana is a Bangladeshi politician who is elected as Member of 11th Jatiya Sangsad of Reserved Seats for Women. She is a politician of Bangladesh Awami League.

References

Living people
Awami League politicians
People from Mymensingh District
11th Jatiya Sangsad members
Women members of the Jatiya Sangsad
Year of birth missing (living people)
21st-century Bangladeshi women politicians